James Young (July 18, 1866 - April 29, 1942) was a U.S. Representative from Texas.

Born in Henderson, Texas, Young attended the public schools.
He was graduated from the law department of the University of Texas at Austin in July 1891.
He was admitted to the bar the same year and commenced practice in Kaufman, Texas.

Young was elected as a Democrat to the Sixty-second and to the four succeeding Congresses (March 4, 1911 – March 3, 1921).
He declined to be a candidate for renomination in 1920.
He again engaged in the practice of law in Kaufman, Texas.
He was an unsuccessful candidate for the Democratic gubernatorial nomination in 1930.
He moved to Henderson, Texas, in 1931, and continued the practice of law until 1937, when he moved to Dallas, Texas, where he died April 29, 1942.
He was interred in the Kaufman Cemetery, Kaufman, Texas.

Sources

 
 
 

1866 births
1942 deaths
Democratic Party members of the United States House of Representatives from Texas
People from Henderson, Texas
People from Kaufman, Texas